Aphnaeus jefferyi, the Jeffery's highflier or Jeffrey's silver spot, is a butterfly in the family Lycaenidae. It is found in Guinea, Sierra Leone, Ghana, Cameroon, western Kenya, Uganda (around Mount Elgon) and north-western Tanzania. The habitat consists of woodland.

References

Butterflies described in 1928
Aphnaeus